This page lists notable persons with ties to St. Francis College.

Alumni and former students

Academics
Brendan J. Dugan, '68, former regional chairman and CEO of Sovereign Bank and 18th President of St. Francis College
Donald A. McQuade, PhD, '63, former vice chancellor for university relations at the University of California, Berkeley
Frank J. Macchiarola, LL.B., PhD, '62, former president of St. Francis College (1996–2008), chairman of the New York State Higher Education Services Commission, chancellor of St. Francis College
John J. McDermott, PhD, '53, philosopher and distinguished professor at Texas A&M University

Architecture
Joseph Hubert McGuire, 1887, American architect practicing in New York City, where he specialized in Catholic churches and institutions.
Joseph A. Jackson, American architect who designed many buildings for Roman Catholic clients in the Eastern United States

Arts and literature
Jim Brochu, '69, actor and playwright
Joseph Skerrett, PhD, '64, American literary critic and professor of English at the University of Massachusetts Amherst.   
Jim Luisi, '51, Emmy award winning actor

Business and finance
John R. Meyer, '74, head of the Annuity Department at New York Life Insurance and Senior Vice President
Thomas F. Woodlock, 1905, editor of the Wall Street Journal and US Interstate Commerce Commission commissioner.

Government and politics
Eric A. Ulrich, '07, New York City Councilman, 32nd District
Ronald Castorina, J.D., '01, assembly member for the 62nd District of the New York State Assembly   
Dick Stevenson, M.B.A., '73, member of the Pennsylvania House of Representatives, the 8th District
Thomas J. Pickard, M.B.A./C.P.A., '72, former Director of the Federal Bureau of Investigation
Thomas Von Essen, '72, 30th FDNY Commissioner of the City of New York
Richard Sheirer, '67, director of the New York City Office of Emergency Management (O.E.M.) during the 11 September attacks.
Peter T. King, J.D., '65, U.S. Representative, New York's 3rd congressional district
Thomas J. Cuite, '35, former New York State Senator and majority leader of the New York City Council
John J. Bennett Jr., 56th New York State Attorney General
Joseph L. Pfeifer, M.D., U.S. Representative, New York's 3rd and 8th congressional districts
Thomas H. Cullen, 1880, U.S. Representative, New York's 4th congressional district

Law
Margo Kitsy Brodie, J.D., '88, federal judge for the United States District Court for the Eastern District of New York.
Frank Altimari, J.D., '48, Senior Federal Appeals Judge, Second Circuit Court of Appeals
John Francis Dooling Jr., LL.B., '29, federal judge for the United States District Court for the Eastern District of New York
Walter F. Timpone, Associate Justice of the Supreme Court of New Jersey

Military
Timothy F. O'Keefe, '40, former General in the United States Air Force, who served in World War II, the Korean War and the Vietnam War and was the recipient of numerous medals and honors.

Other

Feliz Ramirez, '13,Actress of ABC television series Grand Hotel
Pete Davidson, comedian and former cast member of Saturday Night Live.
Hector Batista, '84, CEO of Big Brothers Big Sisters of NYC.

Religion
Thomas Edmund Molloy, 1904, Bishop of Brooklyn from 1921 to 1956.

Science and technology
Donald J. Metz, PhD, '47, nuclear engineer at Brookhaven National Laboratory and professor at St. Francis College

Sports
John Mangieri, '97, Pitcher drafted by the New York Mets, member of the Italian World Baseball Classic Team
John Halama, '94, Major League Baseball Pitcher
Barry Rohrssen, '83, former basketball head coach of the Manhattan College Jaspers
Joseph Browne, '68, Executive Vice President Communications and Public Affairs, NFL
 Mark Turenshine, '66, American-Israeli basketball player
Dick Bavetta, '62, NBA referee

Faculty and Staff
Dinesh Sharma, senior fellow at the Institute for International and Cross-Cultural Research.
Nelson Barbosa, former professor at St. Francis College, current Brazil's Minister of Finance.
Joseph Brennan, former men's basketball head coach and member of the Basketball Hall of Fame, class of '75.
Peter Kavanagh, (19 March 1916-January 27, 2006) writer, scholar, and publisher
Ed Setrakian, professor emeritus at St. Francis College, playwright, director and actor. Played Al Hyman, in the film "Zodiac."
John Sexton, former chair of the Religion Department, currently the fifteenth president of New York University
Sue Wicks, former assistant head coach for the Lady Terriers Basketball team and former WNBA player.
Rich Zvosec, former men's basketball head coach and ESPN commentator.

References

St. Francis College